Muscle Up a Little Closer is a 1957 short subject directed by Jules White starring American slapstick comedy team The Three Stooges (Moe Howard, Larry Fine and Joe Besser). It is the 176th entry in the series released by Columbia Pictures starring the comedians, who released 190 shorts for the studio between 1934 and 1959.

Plot
Moe, Larry and Joe are about to propose marriage to their sweethearts. But later, the boys discover that Joe's fiancee's ring has been stolen. The Stooges suspect it is Elmo, a muscular bully who works at their plant. The Stooges eventually come face to face with him in the company gym, but when they try to make him give the ring back by physical force, the plan backfires and Moe and Larry are knocked senseless. But Joe's girl (Maxine Gates) is tougher and knocks out Elmo. She retrieves the ring and she can now marry Joe.

Production notes
Filmed on June 27–29, 1956, Muscle Up a Little Closer was the first film to feature Moe and Larry's more "gentlemanly" haircuts, first suggested by Joe Besser. However, these had to be used sparingly, as most of the shorts with Besser were remakes of earlier films, and new footage had to be matched with old.

The title of the film parodies the Otto Harbach/Karl Hoschna 1908 song "Cuddle up a Little Closer, Lovey Mine".

References

External links 
 
 
 Muscle Up a Little Closer at threestooges.net

1957 films
1957 comedy films
The Three Stooges films
American black-and-white films
Films directed by Jules White
Columbia Pictures short films
1950s English-language films
1950s American films